Kli-Kla-Klawitter is a German television series.

See also
List of German television series

External links
 

German children's television series
1974 German television series debuts
1976 German television series endings
German-language television shows
ZDF original programming